Robecq is a commune in the Pas-de-Calais department in the Hauts-de-France region of France.

Geography
The Canal d’Aire and the rivers Clarence and Busnes all flow through the commune.

History
During World War I intense action took place close to Robecq. In his posthumously published memoir, Private A S Bullock recalls the fighting at Bacquerolles Farm, noting that the German attack was repelled 'chiefly by my Lewis gun!'. He also recalls a much lighter, indeed hilarious, incident when the British troops stationed near Robecq were ordered to have a bath.

Population

Places of interest
 The church of St. Maurice, dating from the fourteenth century.
 The eighteenth-century farmhouse of L’Abiette.
 The war memorial.
 The Commonwealth War Graves Commission cemetery.

See also
 Lords of Robecque
 Communes of the Pas-de-Calais department

References

External links

 The CWGC graves in the churchyard

Communes of Pas-de-Calais